Frahelž is a municipality and village in Jindřichův Hradec District in the South Bohemian Region of the Czech Republic. It has about 100 inhabitants.

Notable people
Jack Root (1875–1963), American boxer

References

Villages in Jindřichův Hradec District